H. Keith Moo-Young (born April 11, 1969) is the Vice Provost and Dean of Undergraduate Education of the Rensselaer Polytechnic Institute. From 2013-2018, he served as the Chancellor at Washington State University.  From 2006-2013, he was the Dean of Engineering at California State University, Los Angeles. Dr. Moo-Young was the Associate Dean for Research and Graduate Studies at Villanova University, where he also served as Interim Dean from 2004-06.

Biography

Early life 
Moo-Young was born in Washington, D.C. Moo-Young graduated in 1991 with a B.S. degree in civil engineering and was Valedictorian from Morgan State University. Dr. Moo-Young was a four time scholar athlete of the year and was recently elected to the Morgan State University Hall of Fame for winning the Cross Country team title in 1990. He then attended the Rensselaer Polytechnic Institute on a National Defense Science and Engineering Fellowship, where he earned an M.S. (1992) and Ph.D. (1995), both in civil and environmental engineering. He received an Executive Masters in Technology Management from the University of Pennsylvania, and a Management Develop Certificate from Harvard University.

Research career 
Moo-Young has served on the faculty at Lehigh University, Villanova University, Cal State L.A., Washington State University and RPI.  Dr. Moo-Young's research interests include sustainability of solid and hazardous waste management systems, environmental containment and remediation technologies, and he has authored or co-authored more than 200 peer-reviewed publications and presentations. Moo- Young is a member of the National Academy of Inventors,  a fellow of the American Association for the Advancement of Science (AAAS), American Society of Civil Engineers (ASCE) and American Academy of Environmental Engineers, and he served as the chair of the Environmental Engineering Committee for the Science Advisory Board of the U.S. Environmental Protection Agency.

Moo-Young is a member of the National Advisory Board of the Great Minds in STEM.

References 

1969 births
Fellows of the American Association for the Advancement of Science
Rensselaer Polytechnic Institute faculty
Rensselaer Polytechnic Institute alumni
Living people
University of Pennsylvania alumni